The Cook County Public Defender provides legal representation for indigent clients in the areas of felony and  misdemeanor criminal cases, delinquency, abuse/neglect, some appeals, post-conviction and traffic (non-petty) cases when appointed by the Court throughout Cook County, Illinois, which includes Chicago. Currently, the Cook County Public Defender is [Sharone R. Mitchell, Jr.]. It is the second largest state public defender office in the United States after the Los Angeles County Public Defender.

Divisions
Capital Case Coordinator 
Child Protection 
Felony Trial 
Forensic Science 
Homicide Task Force 
Investigations 
Juvenile Justice 
Legal Resources (formerly Appeals and Post Conviction) 
Multiple Defendant Division 
Professional Development

References

Government of Cook County, Illinois
Public defender
Criminal defense organizations